7/10 may refer to:

July 10 (month-day date notation)
October 7 (day-month date notation)
The Seven Ten Rule, a rule about radioactive fallout